Katzenbach may refer to:

Places 
 Katzenbach, Germany, a municipality in the Donnersbergkreis district, in Rhineland-Palatinate, Germany
 Katzenberg, subdivision in Kapelln, Austria
 Katzenbach (Werre), a river of North Rhine-Westphalia, Germany
 Katzenbach (Neckar), a river of Baden-Württemberg, Germany

People
 Frank S. Katzenbach (1868–1929), New Jersey Supreme Court justice
 Edward L. Katzenbach (1878–1934), New Jersey Attorney General, brother of Frank S. Katzenbach, father of Nicholas Katzenbach
 Nicholas Katzenbach (1922–2012), U.S. Attorney General during the Lyndon B. Johnson administration, son of Edward L. Katzenbach
 Marie Hilson Katzenbach (1882–1970), American educator, wife of Edward L. Katzenbach
 John Katzenbach (born 1950), American novelist, son of Nicholas Katzenbach
 Jon Katzenbach, American management consultant and author

Supreme Court cases
 Katzenbach v. McClung, 1964 case in which the Court held that Congress acted within its power under the Commerce Clause of the United States Constitution in forbidding racial discrimination in restaurants as this was a burden to interstate commerce. 
Katzenbach v. Morgan, 1966 case regarding the power of Congress, pursuant to Section 5 of the Fourteenth Amendment, to enact laws which enforce and interpret provisions of the Constitution
 South Carolina v. Katzenbach, 1966 case which rejected a challenge by the state of South Carolina to the preclearance provisions of the Voting Rights Act of 1965, which required that some states submit changes in election districts to the Attorney General of the United States (at the time, Nicholas Katzenbach).

Other uses
 Katzenbach Partners, a management consulting firm

German-language surnames
Jewish surnames
Yiddish-language surnames